Thomas, Tom or Tommy Mason may refer to:

Politicians
 Stevens T. Mason (Stevens Thomson Mason, 1811–1843), also known Tom Mason, founding Governor of Michigan, 1835–1840
 Thomas Mason (1770–1800), American businessman, planter, and politician, youngest son of George Mason
 Thomas Mason (New Zealand politician) (1818–1903), New Zealand politician
 Tom Mason (Ontario politician), Green Party candidate
 Tom Mason (Scottish politician) (born 1942), Conservative MSP
 Thomas Mason (MP), MP for Salisbury
 Thomas Mason (burgess), member of the House of Burgesses

Sports
 Tom Mason (footballer) (1886–1954), English football forward (Tottenham Hotspur)
 Tommy Mason (1939–2015), American football player
 Tommy Mason (English footballer) (born 1953), English football midfielder (Brighton & Hove Albion)
 Tommy Mason (New Zealand footballer) (born 1960), New Zealand international footballer (Fulham)
 Tom Mason (American football) (born 1956), American football coach

Actors
 Tom Mason (actor, born 1920) (1920–1980), American chiropractor, actor and producer known for his association with film-maker Ed Wood
 Tom Mason (actor, born 1949) (born 1949), American actor
 Thomas B. Mason (1919–2007), American U.S. attorney and actor

Others
 Thomas Mason (priest) (1580–1619), English writer
 Thomas Monck Mason (1803–1889), flute player, writer, and balloonist
 Thomas Henry Mason (1811–1900), British Admiral
 Thomas Mason (physicist), Canadian-born American physicist
 Tom Mason (Falling Skies), a protagonist of Falling Skies TV series played by Noah Wyle

See also 
 Thomas Mayson (disambiguation)
 Thomson Mason (disambiguation)